The 2012 All Japan Indoor Tennis Championships was a professional tennis tournament played on clay courts. It was the 16th edition of the tournament which was part of the 2012 ATP Challenger Tour. It took place in Kyoto, Japan between 5 and 11 June March.

ATP entrants

Seeds

 1 Rankings are as of February 27, 2012.

Other entrants
The following players received wildcards into the singles main draw:
  Takuto Niki
  Takao Suzuki
  Shota Tagawa
  Yasutaka Uchiyama

The following players received entry from the qualifying draw:
  Matthew Barton
  Brydan Klein
  Purav Raja
  Yi Chu-huan

Champions

Singles

 Tatsuma Ito def.  Malek Jaziri, 6–7(5–7), 6–1, 6–2

Doubles

 Sanchai Ratiwatana /  Sonchat Ratiwatana def.  Hsieh Cheng-peng /  Lee Hsin-han, 7–6(9–7), 6–3

External links
Official Website
ITF Search
ATP official site

All Japan Indoor Tennis Championships
All Japan Indoor Tennis Championships
2012 in Japanese tennis